Warren Abery (born 28 June 1973) is a South African professional golfer. He currently plays on the Sunshine Tour where he won seven times between 1998 and 2011.

Abery was born in Durban, and currently resides in Ballito. He won the South African Amateur Tournament in 1995 and turned professional in 1997 the same year he joined the Sunshine Tour, where he found immediate success. He gained a place on the European Tour in 2006 and 2012 via qualifying school, but was unable to retain his card.

Amateur wins (3)
1994 Natal Amateur
1995 Natal Amateur, South African International Amateur Match-play

Professional wins (8)

Sunshine Tour wins (7)

Sunshine Tour playoff record (0–3)

Other wins (1)
 2005 Sun City Touring Pro-Am (Not considered an official Sunshine Tour event)

Results in major championships

CUT = missed the halfway cut
Note: Abery only played in The Open Championship.

Results in World Golf Championships

Team appearances
Amateur
Eisenhower Trophy (representing South Africa): 1996
Source:

See also
2005 European Tour Qualifying School graduates
2011 European Tour Qualifying School graduates

References

External links

South African male golfers
European Tour golfers
Sunshine Tour golfers
Sportspeople from Durban
White South African people
1973 births
Living people